Tatyana Blokhina (née Sidorova); born 12 March 1970) is a Russian female former track and field athlete who competed for Russia and the Soviet Union in combined track and field events.

Career
She is a two-time Russian national champion, having won the heptathlon in 1993 and the indoor pentathlon in 1999. This was her speciality event and she holds a personal best of  overall.

She represented her country at the 1993 World Championships in Athletics and the 1988 World Junior Championships in Athletics, but failed to complete all seven events on those occasions. She had more success at European level, winning a gold medal at the 1989 European Athletics Junior Championships and placing fifth in the pentathlon at the 1992 European Athletics Indoor Championships.

Blokhina ranked third in the world for the 1993 indoor season, in which she set a career best total of 4669 points for pentathlon in Moscow. Her personal best in the heptathlon, 6703 points achieved at the 1993 Décastar, ranked her second among Europeans that season behind Germany's Sabine Braun, and fourth at global level – her highest career ranking. As of 2018, her career best ranked her 25th on the all-time heptathlon rankings.

International competitions

National titles
Russian Athletics Championships
Heptathlon: 1993
Russian Indoor Athletics Championships
Pentathlon: 1999

References

External links

Living people
1970 births
Russian heptathletes
Soviet heptathletes
Russian pentathletes
Soviet pentathletes
World Athletics Championships athletes for Russia
Russian Athletics Championships winners